Mohamed Haggag (born January 9, 1985) is an Egyptian professional footballer who plays as a defender for Al Nasr. In 2012, Haggag signed a 5-year contract for El Gouna. He was part of El Nasr squad which succeeded to promote to 2017–18 Egyptian Premier League.

References

1985 births
Living people
Al Nasr SC (Egypt) players
Egyptian footballers
Association football defenders